Cavalry Corps Schmettow was a formation of the German Army in World War I.

Cavalry Corps Schmettow 
By August 1916, the four existing Cavalry Commanders (I, III, V and VI Cavalry Corps) had been assigned sectors of the Eastern Front and thus took on the functions similar to a normal Corps and had been reorganised in a similar fashion. Therefore, for the Romanian Campaign, none of the existing Cavalry Corps were brought in.  Instead, a new temporary Cavalry Corps was set up in Transylvannia - Cavalry Corps "Schmettow" - under the command of Generalleutnant Eberhard Graf von Schmettow.  It was formed with:
51st Honvéd Infantry Division (Austria-Hungary)
3rd Cavalry Division
1st Cavalry Division (Austria-Hungary)

Redesignated 11 January 1917 as 65th Corps (z.b.V.).

65th Corps
65th Corps (z.b.V.) was formed on 11 January 1917 by the redesignation of Cavalry Corps "Schmettow".  As the need for large mounted cavalry formations diminished as the war went on, the existing Cavalry Corps increasingly took on the characteristics of a normal Corps Command.  This culminated in them being redesignated as "General Commands for Special Use" Generalkommandos zur besonderen Verwendung (Genkdo z.b.V.).

By the end of the war, the Corps was serving on the Western Front as part of the 7th Army with the following composition:
 5th Division
 4th Guards Division
 216th Division
 50th Division

Commanders 
Cavalry Corps Schmettow / 65th Corps was commanded throughout its existence by Generalleutnant Eberhard Graf von Schmettow.

See also 

German Army (German Empire)
German Army order of battle, Western Front (1918)
German cavalry in World War I

References

Bibliography 
 
 

Corps of Germany in World War I
Cavalry corps of Germany
Military units and formations established in 1916
Military units and formations disestablished in 1919

de:Höheres Kavallerie-Kommando